Mephenytoin (marketed as Mesantoin by Novartis) is a hydantoin, used as an anticonvulsant. It was introduced approximately 10 years after phenytoin, in the late 1940s. The significant metabolite of mephenytoin is nirvanol (5-ethyl-5-phenylhydantoin), which was the first hydantoin (briefly used as a hypnotic). However, nirvanol is quite toxic and mephenytoin was only considered after other less toxic anticonvulsants had failed. It can cause potentially fatal blood dyscrasia in 1% of patients.

Mephenytoin is no longer available in the US or the UK. It is still studied largely because of its interesting hydroxylation polymorphism.

References

 
 
 

Anticonvulsants
Hydantoins